Gerhard Heinze (born 30 November 1948) is a retired German football player. He spent 15 seasons in the Bundesliga with VfB Stuttgart and MSV Duisburg. The best result he achieved in the league was fifth place.

References

External links
 

1948 births
Living people
German footballers
VfB Stuttgart players
MSV Duisburg players
Bundesliga players
2. Bundesliga players
Association football goalkeepers
People from Neu-Ulm
Sportspeople from Swabia (Bavaria)
Footballers from Bavaria